Pediasia pectinicornis is a species of moth in the family Crambidae described by Hans Rebel in 1910. It is found in Russia and western Central Asia.

The length of the forewings is about 12.5 mm.

References

Moths described in 1910
Crambini
Moths of Asia
Moths of Europe